Marjorie Lee Eaton (February 5, 1901 – April 21, 1986) was an American painter, photographer and character actress best known for physically portraying Emperor Palpatine in the original release of The Empire Strikes Back, though her face was masked and her voice dubbed. The 2004 DVD release of the film had her replaced by the best-known portrayer of the character, Ian McDiarmid.

Biography

Eaton was born in Oakland, California and raised in the San Francisco suburb of Palo Alto, California. She attended the Katherine Delmar Burke School and graduated in 1920. She studied at The Art Institute of Boston, in Florence, Italy and in Paris.

In 1925, Eaton's stepmother, Edith Cox Eaton, purchased the historic Palo Alto house of Juana Briones de Miranda and it became a celebrated art colony and family home up until 2011, when it was demolished.  Artist Lucretia Van Horn and sculptor Louise Nevelson spent significant periods of time there, as did Marjorie. In 1939, Marjorie designed and built her own adobe near the Briones house working closely with renowned architect Gregory Ain. Marjorie Eaton had taken painting classes with Hans Hofmann at the Art Students League of New York and afterwards shared a studio with Louise Nevelson whom she met at the League. Marjorie and Louise lived downstairs from Diego Rivera and Frida Kahlo and the four became close friends and fellow artists.

Though trained in the Stanislavsky method of acting, Marjorie Eaton's initial career choice was to work as either an architect or commercial artist. Before acting, she had joined the art colony in Taos, New Mexico from 1928 to 1932 and Mexico from 1933 to 1935,
 where she lived with and worked with Diego Rivera on locations in northern Mexico. She gained "a reputation for modernist figural work with bold lines, strong color, and Cubist influenced." Her painting "Taos Ceremony" was exhibited in December 2008 as part of a retrospective exhibit "Colorado and the Old West", which showcased 19th and 20th century artworks related to Colorado and New Mexico.  However, she found it impossible to make a living as a woman artist, so she gave up painting entirely and turned to acting.

Eaton appeared both in film and on stage, performing in a number of Broadway plays. She made her (uncredited) film debut in Anna and the King of Siam in 1946. Later roles included Hester Forstye in That Forsyte Woman (1949), Madame Romanovitch in Night Tide (1961), the starring role of Hetty March in the low-budget, science fiction B movie Monstrosity (1963), Miss Persimmon in Mary Poppins (1964), and Sister Ursula in The Trouble with Angels (1966).

In 1979, aged 78, Eaton filmed scenes for The Empire Strikes Back, the second Star Wars film. Eaton portrayed the role of Emperor Palpatine, under heavy makeup, with superimposed chimpanzee eyes and a voice dubbed over by Clive Revill. While Revill received on-screen credit, Eaton did not, and they were both replaced by Ian McDiarmid for the 2004 DVD release. The makeup was sculpted by Phil Tippett and applied by Rick Baker, who had used his own wife Elaine for the makeup tests. As nobody received on-screen credit for playing the Emperor other than voice actor Clive Revill, the identity of the actor was initially unclear. It was widely and incorrectly reported that Elaine Baker had appeared on screen, while in reality she was only used for makeup tests and it is Eaton who appears in the final film. As a result, Eaton's role in the film was unconfirmed until 2016.

In March 1986, she suffered a stroke. On April 21, 1986, she died at her childhood home in Palo Alto surrounded by two nieces and a nephew by marriage.  After the memorial services, her cremated ashes were scattered in two places: half over the property where she grew up and half in Taos where she spent years as an artist.

Filmography

Film 

 Anna and the King of Siam (1946) as Miss MacFarlane (uncredited)
 The Time of Their Lives (1946) as Bessie (uncredited)
 Mourning Becomes Electra (1947) as Woman at home
 A Woman's Vengeance (1948) as Maid (uncredited)
 The Snake Pit (1948) as Patient (uncredited)
 That Forsyte Woman (1949) as Hester Forsyte
 The Story of Seabiscuit (1949) as Miss Newsome (uncredited)
 The Vicious Years (1950) as Zia Lola
 Hollywood Story (1951) as Weird-Looking Woman (uncredited)
 Rose of Cimarron (1952) as Townswoman (uncredited)
 Hold That Line (1952) as Miss Whitsett (uncredited)
 Zombies of Mora Tau (1957) as Grandmother Peters
 Witness for the Prosecution (1957) as Miss O'Brien (uncredited)
 Night Tide (1961) as Madame Romanovitch
 The Three Stooges in Orbit (1962) as Mrs. McGinnis (uncredited)
 Monstrosity/The Atomic Brain (1963) as Hetty March
 Mary Poppins (1964) as Miss Persimmon
 The Trouble with Angels (1966) as Sister Ursula
 Yours, Mine and Ours (1968) as Housekeeper #3
 Bullitt (1968) as Mrs. Larkin (uncredited)
 Hail, Hero! (1969) as Carl's Aunt
 Harold and Maude (1971) as Madame Arouet (uncredited)
 Hammersmith Is Out (1972) as Princess
 The Killing Kind (1973) as Mrs. Orland
 The Reincarnation of Peter Proud (1975) as Astrology Lady
 Cardiac Arrest (1980) as Mrs. Swan
 The Attic (1980) as Mrs. Fowler
 The Empire Strikes Back (1980) as The Emperor (voiced by Clive Revill) (uncredited)
 Street Music (1981) as Mildred
 Crackers (1984) as Mrs. O'Malley (final film role)

Television 

 The Lone Ranger (1 episode, 1950) as Essie Newton
 Hallmark Hall of Fame (1 episode, 1953)
 Studio One in Hollywood (1 episode, 1954) as Marha
 Robert Montgomery Presents  (2 episodes, 1952-1955)
 The Adventures of Jim Bowie (1 episode, 1957) as Mme. Beaubrun
 The Loretta Young Show (1 episode, 1959) as Sara
 Alcoa Presents: One Step Beyond (1 episode, 1959) as Miss Parsons
 My Three Sons (2 episodes, 1960-1961) as Cynthia Pitts
 Alfred Hitchcock Presents (1 episode, 1962) as Landlady
 Bob Hope Presents the Chrysler Theatre (1 episode, 1963) as Old Woman
 Mr. Terrific Mr. Terrific (1 episode, 1967) as Princess
 Then Came Bronson (1 episode, 1969) as Madame Vanya
 The F.B.I. (1 episode, 1970) as Mrs. Elbert
 The Streets of San Francisco (1 episode, 1973)
 The Waltons (1 episode, 1973) as Mrs. Crofut

Theatre
Eaton's Broadway credits include Merchant of Venice, Bell, Book and Candle in 1950, In the Summer House in 1953, and One Eye Closer in 1954.

References

Further reading 
 Rindfleisch, Jan, with articles by Maribel Alvarez and Raj Jayadev, edited by Nancy Hom and Ann Sherman. Roots and Offshoots: Silicon Valley's Arts Community. Santa Clara, CA: Ginger Press., 2017. pp. 44–52.

External links 

 
 

1901 births
1986 deaths
20th-century American actresses
American film actresses
American stage actresses
American television actresses
Artists from Oakland, California
Art Students League of New York alumni
American women painters
Actresses from Oakland, California
Painters from California
20th-century American women artists